Hemerophis is a genus of snake in the family Colubridae  that contains the sole species Hemerophis socotrae. It is commonly known as the Socotran racer.

It is found in Yemen.

References 

Colubrids
Monotypic snake genera
Reptiles described in 1881
Reptiles of the Middle East